Funeral oration or Funeral Oration may refer to:
Eulogy
Funeral oration (ancient Greece)
Oration at Korean traditional funeral
Pericles' Funeral Oration, delivered at the end of the first year of the First Peloponnesian War to honor the Athenian war dead and their society
A Funeral Oration (Lysias) by Lysias, one of the "Canon of Ten" Attic orators (Speech 2 in Lamb's translation)
Funeral Oration (band), a punk rock band from Amsterdam, The Netherlands